John Dunlap (1747–1812) was an American printer.

John Dunlap may also refer to:
 John R. Dunlap (1857–1937), American journalist, editor and publisher
 John F. Dunlap (1922–2022), American politician in California
 John T. Dunlap (born 1957), member of the Sovereign Military Order of Malta